The 2015 Maserati Challenger was a professional tennis tournament played on clay courts. It was the second edition of the tournament which was part of the 2015 ATP Challenger Tour. It took place in Meerbusch, Germany, between 17 and 23 August 2015.

Entrants

Seeds 

 1 Rankings as of 10 August 2015

Other entrants 
The following players received wildcards into the singles main draw:
  Pavle Daljev
  Marvin Greven
  Philipp Petzschner 
  Bastian Trinker 

The following players received entry from the qualifying draw:
  Philipp Davydenko
  Sadio Doumbia
  Michael Geerts
  Yannik Reuter

Champions

Singles 

  Andreas Haider-Maurer def.  Carlos Berlocq 6–2, 6–4

Doubles 

  Dustin Brown /  Rameez Junaid  def.  Wesley Koolhof /  Matwé Middelkoop 6–4, 7–5

External links 
 Official website

2015 ATP Challenger Tour
Maserati Challenger
Maserati Challenger